Yaman (also known as kalyaan, Iman, Aiman,'Eman', 'Kalyani' in Carnatic classical music) is a heptatonic (Sampurna) Indian classical raga of Kalyan Thaat. 

Its signature phrase (Pakad) is ni-Re-Ga-/Re-Ga/ni-Re-Sa/Pa-Ma#-Ga-Re/ni-Re-Sa' (Ma is teevra).

Tonal movements of the notes mostly reflect zigzag motion with gap of one or several notes usually that prefer reverse order very often like DNS'   mDN GmD RGm N,GR or MDNS'   GmDN RGmD N,RGm D,N,GR etc. Ideally yaman should not use PR combination but can use P~R showing colour of m or G while gliding from P to R, for PR is one of the specific identification of raag kalyaan.

Description 
Yaman emerged from the parent musical scale of Kalyan. Considered to be one of the most fundamental and basic ragas in Hindustani tradition, it is thus often one of the first ragas taught to students.

Mechanics 
Yaman's Jati is a Sampurna raga (ideally, yaman is audav sampoorna raag because of the structure- N,RGmDNR'S' NDPmGRS) and in some cases Shadav; the ascending Aaroha scale and the descending style of the avroha includes all seven notes in the octave (When it is audav, the Aroha goes like N,RGmDNS', where the fifth note is omitted; Pa but the Avaroha is the same complete octave). All the scale notes (called swaras) in the raga are Shuddha, the exception being Teevra Madhyam or prati madhyamam (sharp fourth). The notes of the raga are considered analogous to the western Lydian mode.

None of the three great treatises of music, accept the existence of  ma,[text missing]

Not to be mistaken, Raag Yaman is slightly different from Raag Yaman Kalyan. Both have almost the same base, but they are sung differently. The Aroha and Avaroha of Yaman Kalyan goes like this:
SRGmPDNS'
S'NDPm GMGRN, RS

Vadi and samavadi 
Vadi is ga, Samvadi is ni.

Pakad or chalan 
It is wrong to say that Kalyan has no specific phrases or particular features, many musicians avoid Sa and Pa in ascend or treat them very weakly in Yaman. One often applies N0 R G M+ D N S' in ascent and S' N D M+ G R S in descend).
Sa is avoided in beginning the ascend such as N0 R G M+ P D N S'

ni-Re-Ga-/Re-Ga/ni-Re-Sa/Pa-Ma#-Ga-Re/ni-Re-Sa' (Ma is teevra)

Organization and relationships 
There is some discussion whether Yaman and Kalyan really just are different names for the same raga, or that these are actually 2 ragas. Joep Bor says "Kalyan (today usually referred to as Yaman)", Kaufmann says that Yaman and Kalyan are just different names, but insists that rāga Yaman-Kalyan is different as natural Ma is occasionally inserted between two Ga, like Ga Ma Ga Re Sa, while in all other instances  (Ma+ is used as in Kalyan). S. Bagchee agrees with Kaufmann.
As Bor, Kaufmann and Bagchee are not practising, professional and traditional musicians and artistes with training from qualified musicians for several hundred (+practising) hours and knowing a few dozens of bandishes/ compositions of north Indian Hindustani classical music in raag yaman, thus their opinions and observations needs to be accepted with a pinch of salt. A sensible analysis of large data of the raag, honesty and truthful introspection lead any sane musicians to think, that the name of the raags Yaman and Kalyan are different so their tonal movements shall be different for Kalyan is more akin to shuddha Kalyan not Yaman in any case. The influence of Kalyani of Carnatic and almost blind following of Pt. Bhatkhande as well as unquestionable trust and faith to guru (music teachers) caused this confusion. People erratically believe that if natural Ma is occasionally added in a concluding figure leading to Sa, the raga is known as Yaman-Kalyan.
Practically, yaman has a raganga very much different from Kalyan raganga resembling colours of Shuddha Kalyan. The use of shuddha ma must be restricted as a Vivadi swara (limited use) or grace note for Yaman Kalyan otherwise there is a chance of it becoming Yamani, Yamani Bilawal, Jaimini Kalyan. Moreover, neither of Kalyan or Yaman has Shuddha Ma in its main body thus use of shuddha Ma does not create Yaman Kalyan. Ideally there is no raga at all in Indian music that is recognized as any type of Kalyan because of shuddha Ma, thus raga Yaman Kalyan becomes a misnomer or pure lie because of Shuddha Ma in the tonal structure of raga Yaman.
Kalyan is mixed with several ragas that has either of Kalyan ang or Yaman ang:
 Adbhut Kalyan
 Anandi Kalyan
 Bhog Kalyan
 Bhoop Kalyan
 Bilas khani Kalyan
 Chandra Kalyan
 Chhaya Kalyan
 Deepak Kalyan
 Gaud Kalyan
 Gorakh Kalyan
 Hameer Kalyan
 Hem Kalyan
 Hindol Kalyan
 Husseini Kalyan
 Jaimini Kalyan
 Jait Kalyan
 Kamod Kalyan
 Kedar Kalyan
 Kesari Kalyan
 Khem Kalyan
 Kohri Kalyan
 Laxmi Kalyan
 Maru Kalyan
 Miyaan ki Kalyan
 Nand Kalyan
 Nat Kalyan
 Panch Kalyan
 Poorva Kalyan
 Puriya Kalyan
 Pyaar Kalyan
 Raam Kalyan
 Raini Kalyan
 Ravi Kalyan
 Saraswati Kalyan
 Shankar Kalyan
 Shankaraa Kalyan
 Shiv Kalyan
 Shree Kalyan
 Shuddha Kalyan
 Shyam Kalyan
 Sohni Kalyan
 Yaman Kalyan

Yaman raga mixing in other ragas:
 Kalavati Yaman
 Yaman Bhopali
 Yamani
 Yamani Basant
 Yamani Bilawal
 Yamani Hindol
 Yaman Chhaya

Thaat: Kalyan is type raga of Kalyan thaat. In thaat Kalyan, all notes are shuddha (natural) except  (sharp) Ma.

Behaviour 
Yaman is regarded  one of the grandest and most fundamental  ragas in Hindustani music. It is one of the first ragas taught to students but it also has great scope for improvisation. Raag elaboration can focus more on mandra and madhya saptak, thus the key note chosen for yaman is preferred to be a higher tone.

Samay (time) 
Ragas in the Kalyan thaat, including Yaman, should be performed during the first quarter of the night.

Rasa 
Kalyan is described by Meshakarna(1570) as "lord in white garments and pearl necklace on a splendid lion-throne, under a royal umbrella, fanned with whisk, chewing betel"

This raga promotes romanticism, It sounds romantic, we can see in Bollywood many romantic songs are based on this raga.

A song text is:

Hey friend, without my lover
I don't find peace
At any moment of the day;
Since my lover went away
I spend my nights counting the stars

Historical information 

Yaman or Kalyan is an ancient Indian (Bharatiya) raag which was renamed by Ameer Khusro (1253–1325) from Kalyan to Yaman, Yaman raag originates from the Kalyaan Thaat which makes it aasreya raag of Kalyaan Thaat. These attempts were to take the Bhartiya legacy to the name of Persia as an example Bhartiya numerals are known as Arabic numerals.

Origins 
Hindustani vocalist, scholar and researcher Ramkrishna Das Nadrang states that by name of the raag yaman, musicians think its origin is from Yemen, a country in the Middle East at the southern end of the Arabian Peninsula; but there is no evidence or history of practicing the melody of yaman by the natives of Yemen referring to Hindustani music of India. Thus Yemen seems to have no connection with raag yaman. By traditional restrictions of Gwalior gharana, some olden schools of Hindustani music, the masters of music think that a learner has to bring faith (IMAAN) to the words of a teacher-mentor to progress in music, thus they cherish "imaan laao (submit to the aphorism)" on the part of the students, thus music teaching is started with yaman; as a result the name of yaman was popular as iman too, that is closer to term imaan. 

Ramkrishna Das says that by another hypothesis, word yaman is close to Sanskrit Yavan (Muslim) that gave rise to raag yaman from kalyaan as puritan Hindu musicians preferred calling the melody as yavanon kaa kalyaan i.e. kalyaan of the Muslim artistes which got shortened to become yavan kalyaan > yaman kalyan > yaman. South Indian Carnatic music named yaman like melody as yamuna kalyaani whereas Gwalior Paluskar tradition invented raag Jaimini Kalyaan perhaps match with the Carnatic name. In a sense, it was a derogatory term for melody of yaman with mutilated the sanctity of kalyaan due to excessive zigzag tonal movements which projected downward intricate tonal movements with internal skips/gaps of notes; e.g. niresa, marega, madhapa, gapama, remaga, nisaani, gareni, nidhama, madhani, nirega, repama, nidha saani resaa gare maga pama, madhani mareni madhaniresa, etc. Yaman emphasizes ni, ga, ma along with quite a limited use of saa and pa in the ascent whereas kalyaan emphasizes saa, pa, re, ga with highly limited use of ma and ni. Raag kalyan too, has frequent downward movements in the model of raag shuddha kalyaan.  

There are votaries of calling yaman as the invention of Ameer Khusro (1253-1325), a Sufi saint poet, singer and courtier of several Indian rulers. Raag Vyaakaran (1975, page 468-470) by Bimalakaanta Roychoudhury comprising four varieties of yaman, of which Khusro's yaman has no ni, no tivra ma in ascent except magama. This melody is penta-hexatonic (SRGPDS'| S'DPGmGRS) with vaadi ga-samvaadi dha and given tonal movement in page 469 as (= means lower octave, ' means upper octave) SRGRS D,S RG PGmG RGRS GRS PDS' G'R'S'  DP GmGRG PGRS. This shows that present popular yaman is much more different from the 14th century yaman. 
 
According to Ramkrishna Das, contemporary yaman is derivative of olden raag yamani that evolved by the bank of river Yamuna near Mathura - Vrindavan or Chaiti dhun (melody) of Varanasi. Most precisely yaman seems to be part of yamani due to name of river Yamuna.The folk melody of the song 'Sautan ghar na jaa/ na jaa more saiyaan (SR SN,S D,N,R--N,RGR G~S--)' has the unique and spontaneous tonal movement niresaa (an essential phrase of yaman) which no other known folk melody reflects generally. Oldest chaiti song available is "Piyaa se milan ham jaayeb ho raamaa piyaa se milana" by saint Kabir (1398-1518) of Varanasi that reflects the tones as N,P,N,N,N,SS SS SR SN.S D,N,R-- N,R GMG- G~S--. Both the above-mentioned tonal structures reflect essential movements of contemporary raag yaman sans tivra madhyam, whereas the antaraa of chaiti uses tivra ma as  an essential part of the melody. The raag of chaitis are popularly known as maanjh khamaaj (due to Pandit Ravishankar, Ali Akbar Khan, Vilayat Khan, Nikhil Banerjee), otherwise it was known as yamani to the musicians of Varanasi. The neo raag yamani by sitarist Vilayat Khan is similar with distinction like N,RGMG-  mDNS’N--- S’NDP- mPm GMG RGR SN,S---.

Spontaneous use of tivra madhyam is available in the tune of raag janglaa, prevalent in the rasiya singing of Braj- Vrindavan (mPGMPmP NDNS' DNP- nDP GMPmP), otherwise there is no Indian folk melody that uses tivra ma frequently and spontaneously. As tivra ma, komal re and komal dha are not recognized in the Naatya Shaastra, Brihaddeshi and Sangeet Ratnaakar (1245 AD), there was no raag like kalyaan in pre Muqaam or pre-Melakarta system of raags. Probably, the followers of Khusro, qawwali singers and folk singers brought forward the frequent applications of tivra ma that gave rise to yamani to yaman keeping the movements intact; and further the raag kalyaan due to acceptance and advent of melakarta system in the south/North India as Venkatamakhi (~1630), the propagator of melakarta had been in the North too during the times of Jahangir (1605-1627). Perhaps the name of kalyaan was inspired by the popular tune of Sanskrit verses recited in the evening prayers.    
 
Almost all kinds of tonal combinations can be safely used in broad idea of yaman or so called popular term kalyan, thus sitar maestro Abdul Halim Jaffer Khan used to say "Ye man jo chaahe wahi yaman hai (whatever tonal combinations your mind desires to apply come under the vast umbrella of yaman.)

Important recordings 
 Amir Khan – Shuddh Kalyan, Yaman, and Yaman Kalyan
 Ghulam Abbas Khan Vilambit and Drut 'Dharohar' by Mystica Music
 Imrat Khan "Nordindische Ragas, Live"
 Rashid Khan – bandish in vilambit ektal (India Archive Music IAM CD 1003)
 Ravi Shankar in matta tal: "The Genius of Pandit Ravi Shankar", Oriental Records Inc, New York AAMS CD108
 Zia Mohiuddin Dagar on Nimbus Records, LS5871 / NI7047/8

Film songs

Hindi 

Following is the list of film songs based on Yaman.

References

Literature 

.
.
.
.
.
.
.
.
.
.

External links 
 
 More details about raag Yaman
 
 SRA on Ragas and Thaats
 SRA on Samay and Ragas
 Technical Aspects

Hindustani ragas
Ragas in the Guru Granth Sahib